The Baby Scoop Era was a period in anglosphere history starting after the end of World War II and ending in the early 1970s, characterized by an increasing rate of pre-marital pregnancies over the preceding period, along with a higher rate of newborn adoption.

History

In the United States
From 1945 to 1973, it is estimated that up to 4 million parents in the United States had children placed for adoption, with 2 million during the 1960s alone. Annual numbers for non-relative adoptions increased from an estimated 33,800 in 1951 to a peak of 89,200 in 1970, then quickly declined to an estimated 47,700 in 1975.  (This does not include the number of infants adopted and raised by relatives.) In contrast, the U.S. Department of Health and Human Services estimates that only 14,000 infants were placed for adoption in 2003.

This period of history has been documented in scholarly books such as Wake Up Little Susie and Beggars and Choosers, both by historian Rickie Solinger, and social histories such as the book The Girls Who Went Away and the documentary, A Girl Like Her, based on the book by Ann Fessler.  Fessler is a professor of photography at the Rhode Island School of Design who exhibited an art installation titled The Girls Who Went Away.  It is also the theme of the documentary "Gone To A Good Home" by Film Australia.

Beginning in the 1940s and 1950s, illegitimacy began to be defined in terms of psychological deficits on the part of the mother.  At the same time, a liberalization of sexual morals combined with restrictions on access to birth control led to an increase in premarital pregnancies.  The dominant psychological and social work view was that the large majority of unmarried mothers were better off being separated by adoption from their newborn babies.  According to Mandell (2007), "In most cases, adoption was presented to the mothers as the only option and little or no effort was made to help the mothers keep and raise the children".

Solinger describes the social pressures that led to this unusual trend, explaining that women who had no control over their reproductive lives were defined by psychological theory as "not-mothers", and that because they had no control over their reproductive lives, they were subject to the ideology of those who watched over them. As such, for unmarried pregnant girls and women in the pre-Roe era, the main chance for attaining home and marriage rested on their acknowledging their alleged shame and guilt, and this required relinquishing their children, with more than 80% of unwed mothers in maternity homes acting in essence as "breeders" for adoptive parents. According to Ellison, from 1960 to 1970, 27 percent of all births to married women between the ages of 15 and 29 were conceived premaritally. This problem was thought to be caused by female neurosis, and those who could not procure an abortion, legally or otherwise, were encouraged to put up their children for adoption.

In popular usage, singer Celeste Billhartz uses the term "baby scoop era" on her website to refer to the era covered by her work "The Mothers Project."  A letter on Senator Bill Finch's website uses the term as well. Writer Betty Mandell references the term in her article "Adoption". The term was also used in a 2004 edition of the Richmond Times-Dispatch.

Infant adoptions began declining in the early 1970s, a decline often attributed to the decreasing birth rate, but which also partially resulted from social and legal changes that enabled  middle-class mothers to have an alternative: single motherhood.

The decline in the fertility rate is associated with the introduction of the pill in 1960, the completion of legalization of artificial birth control methods, the introduction of federal funding to make family planning services more available to the young and low income, and the legalization of abortion.

Brozinsky (1994) speaks of the decline in newborn adoptions as reflecting a freedom of choice embraced by youth and the women's movement of the 1960s and 1970s, resulting in an increase in the number of unmarried mothers who parented their babies as opposed to having them taken for adoption purposes. "In 1970, approximately 80% of the infants born to single mothers were [...] [taken for adoption purposes], whereas by 1983 that figure had dropped to only 4%."  

In contrast to numbers in the 1960s and 1970s, from 1989 to 1995 fewer than 1% of children born to never-married women were surrendered for adoption.

In the Commonwealth
A similar social development took place in the United Kingdom, New Zealand, Australia, and Canada.

In Canada
Canada's "Baby Scoop Era" refers to the postwar period from 1945 to 1988, when over 400,000 unmarried pregnant girls, mostly aged 15–19, were targeted for their yet-to-be-born infants, because they were unmarried with a child. A large number of these young women were housed in maternity group homes, which were managed by religious orders, such as the Salvation Army, the Catholic Church, the United Church and the Anglican Church etc. These maternity "homes" were heavily funded by the Canadian government. There were over 70 maternity homes in Canada which housed between 20 and 200 pregnant women at a time. In Canadian maternity "homes" and hospitals, up to 100% of newborns were removed from their legal mothers after birth and given up for adoption purposes. These newborns were taken under a Health and Welfare protocol.

Some professionals of the era considered that the punishment of the mother for her transgression was an important part of the process. Dr. Marion Hilliard of Women's College Hospital was quoted in 1956 saying: The father plays absolutely no part in this. That is part of her rehabilitation. When she renounces her child for its own good, the unwed mother has learned a lot. She has learned an important human value. She has learned to pay the price of her misdemeanor, and this alone, if punishment is needed, is punishment enough...We must go back to a primary set of values and the discipline that starts with the very small child.The term Baby Scoop Era is similar to the term Sixties Scoop, which was coined by Patrick Johnston, author of Native Children and the Child Welfare System. "Sixties Scoop" refers to the Canadian practice, beginning in the 1950s and continuing until the late 1980s, of apprehending unusually high numbers of Native children over the age of 5 years old from their families and fostering or adopting them out. A similar event happened in Australia where Aboriginal children, sometimes referred to as the Stolen Generation, were removed from their families and placed into internment camps, orphanages and other institutions.

In Australia
A similar period of forced adoption, also known as the "White Stolen Generations", also occurred in Australia. It is generally understood that a decline of adoption during the 1970s was linked to a 1973 law providing for financial assistance to single parents.

Portrayals in media
A girl like her documentary film (2011)
Gone To A Good Home (Film Australia 2006). A Film Australia National Interest Program in association with Big Island Pictures. Produced in association with the Pacific Film and Television Commission and SBS Independent.
Everlasting: The Girls Who Went Away by Ann Fessler. Described as "a multi-channel, surround-sound audio installation based on oral history interviews Ann Fessler conducted with women who surrendered a baby for adoption in the 1950s and 1960s (as described in the "Calendar," Duke University, retrieved October 22, 2007)
The Other Mother: A Moment of Truth Movie (1995) (TV)  Director: Bethany Rooney.  Writers (WGA): Carol Schaefer (book), Steven Loring.
The Magdalene Sisters  (2002) Director: Peter Mullan, Writer: Peter Mullan 
Love, War, Adoption (2007) Directed by Suzie Kidnap.

See also 
Michael A. Hess
Vincent Nichols § Acknowledgement of adoption controversy

References

Further reading
 Aston, Jonny. "Yours Hopefully,"  written and published by Jonny Aston. A personal account of teenage pregnancy, adoption and reunion, portraying 1960s social attitudes and prejudices.
 Buterbaugh, K.  "Not by Choice," Eclectica, August 2001.
 Buterbaugh, K.  "Setting the Record Straight", Moxie Magazine, April 2001.
 Fessler, A. (2006). The Girls Who Went Away; The Hidden History of Women Who Surrendered Children for Adoption in the Decades Before Roe v. Wade.  New York:  Penguin Press.  
 Kunzel, R. (1995).  Fallen Women, Problem Girls: Unmarried Mothers and the Professionalization of Social Work, 1890–1945 (Yale Historical Publications Series) (Paperback).  Ann Arbor, MA:  Yale University Press (August 30, 1995)   
 Mandell, B. (2007). "Adoption." New Politics, 11(2), Winter 2007, Whole No. 42.
 Petrie, A. (1998).  Gone to an Aunt's: Remembering Canada's Homes for Unwed Mothers.  Toronto: * McLelland and Stewart. 
 Moor, M. (2007).  Silent Violence: Australia's White Stolen Children. A thesis submitted in fulfilment of the requirement for the Doctorate of Philosophy in Arts, Media and Culture at Griffith University, Nathan, Qld. 
 O'Shaughnassy, T. (1994). Adoption, Social Work, and Social Theory. Brookfield: Ashgate Publishing.  
 Shawyer, J. (1979).  Death by Adoption.  Cicada Press. 
 Solinger, R. (2000). Wake Up Little Susie: Single Pregnancy and Race Before Roe v. Wade.  New York:  Routledge.  
 Solinger, R. (2001). Beggars And Choosers: How The Politics Of Choice Shapes Adoption, Abortion And Welfare In The U.S. (Hill and Wang)
 Terranova, D. (2014). Baby Farm. Brisbane: Terranova Publications. . A novel about forced adoptions in Australia in the 1970s.

Adoption history
Historical eras